Schadeberg is a surname. Notable people with the surname include:

 Henry C. Schadeberg (1913–1985), American politician
 Jürgen Schadeberg (1931–2020), German-born South African photographer and artist
 Thilo C. Schadeberg (born 1942), Emeritus Professor of Bantu Linguistics